Zastranje is a small settlement just north of Šmarje pri Jelšah in eastern Slovenia. The area is part of the traditional region of Styria. The Municipality of Šmarje pri Jelšah is now included in the Savinja Statistical Region.

Remains of a Roman Villa rustica have been identified in the Grobelce part of settlement.

References

External links
Zastranje at Geopedia

Populated places in the Municipality of Šmarje pri Jelšah